Qaleh-ye Mirzai (also Romanized as Qal‘eh-ye Mīrzā’ī; also known as Qal‘eh-ye Mīrzā) is a village in Famur Rural District, Jereh and Baladeh District, Kazerun County, Fars Province, Iran. At the 2006 census, its population was 62, in 14 families.

References 

Populated places in Kazerun County